Dalaki (also Romanized as Dalakī; also known as Dalagī) is a village in Zanjanrud-e Pain Rural District, Zanjanrud District, Zanjan County, Zanjan Province, Iran. At the 2006 census, its population was 103, in 22 families.

References 

Populated places in Zanjan County